The 2018 Lamar Cardinals football team represented Lamar University in the 2018 NCAA Division I FCS football season. The Cardinals were led by second-year head coach Mike Schultz and played their home games at Provost Umphrey Stadium. They played as a member of the Southland Conference. They finished the season 7–5, 6–3 in Southland play to finish in third place. They received an at-large berth to the FCS Playoffs, where they lost in the first round to Northern Iowa.

TV and radio media

All Lamar games will be broadcast on KLVI, also known as News Talk 560.

In fourth year of an agreement (third year for football) with ESPN, live video of all home games (except those picked up by Southland Conference TV agreements) will be streamed on ESPN3.

Previous season
The Cardinals finished the 2017 season 2–9, 1–8 in Southland play to finish in tenth place.

Preseason

Preseason All-Conference Teams
On July 12, 2018, the Southland announced their Preseason All-Conference Teams, with the Cardinals placing one player on the second team.

Defense Second Team
 Zae Giles – Jr. PR

Preseason Poll
On July 19, 2018, the Southland announced their preseason poll, with the Cardinals predicted to finish in tenth place.

Schedule

Game summaries

Kentucky Christian

Sources:

at Texas Tech

Sources:

Northwestern State

Sources:

Southeastern Louisiana

Sources:

at Nicholls State

Sources:

Incarnate Word

Sources:

Sam Houston State

Sources:

at Stephen F. Austin

Sources:

at Central Arkansas

Sources:

Houston Baptist

Sources:

at McNeese State

Sources:

FCS Playoffs

at Northern Iowa–First Round

Sources:

Personnel

Roster
Source:

Depth chart
Source:

Coaching staff

Honors and awards

All Conference Honors
Source:
 Co–Newcomer of the Year: Jordan Hoy
 Offensive Lineman of the Year: Garrett Bowery
 First Team All–Conference Offense: Garrett Bowery
 First Team All–Conference Defense: Davon Jernigan
 Second Team All–Conference Defense: Daniel Crosley

Player of the Week
 Caleb Abrom – October 13 – Southland Conference Special Teams Player of the Week – Returned blocked field goal for game winning touchdown against Incarnate Word.
 Tyler Slayton – October 20 – Southland Conference Special Teams Player of the Week – Averaged 45 yards on 6 punts in upset of No. 14 Sam Houston State.
 Jordan Hoy – October 27 – Southland Conference Offensive Player of the Week – In first Lamar start, Hoy for 225 yards, program best for a quarterback and 7th best overall for the program in win against Stephen F. Austin.
 Jordan Hoy – November 3 – Southland Conference Offensive Player of the Week – Guided Lamar offense to five touchdowns and 512 yards offense in win over No. 19 Central Arkansas.  The win was the first over Central Arkansas in program history.
 Darrel Colbert, Jr. – November 19 – Southland Conference Offensive Player of the Week – Colbert guided the Cardinals to their third win over a nationally ranked team this season with their come-from-behind victory on the road against McNeese.

Ranking movements

References

Lamar
Lamar Cardinals football seasons
Lamar Cardinals football
Lamar